Ketoy (or Ketoi) (Japanese 計吐夷島; Ketoi-tō) is an uninhabited volcanic island located in the centre of the Kuril Islands chain in the Sea of Okhotsk in the northwest Pacific Ocean. Its name is derived from the Ainu language for "skeleton" or "bad".

Geography
The shape of the island is almost circular: approximately 10 km in length by approximately 9 km in width, with an area of    The length of the coastline is 38.3 kilometers. Despite its relatively small area, the island has much landscape diversity, which is explained by its complex geomorphology, in which there are stratovolcanic cones, calderas, lava flows, volcanic plateaus, various valleys, high and steep coastal ledges, sea terraces, and rocky beaches. The steep cliffs ranging from 30 metres to 60 metres on the east and south sides with the west and north being taller. The beaches on the island consist of boulders and stones. The rivers and streams are numerous: mostly flowing to the south and east. The terrain is undulating and steep with numerous hills, rising to two main peaks:

The highest point is  Mount Ketoy -(Japanese 計吐夷岳; Ketoidake) with a height of 1,172 meters  to the east of the 1.5 km wide freshwater caldera lake. The lake is 110 meters deep, and is the source of  the Stochny Creek, which flows into the Pacific Ocean; the surface of the lake is at an altitude of 667 meters. The waters of thermal springs at the lake contain strontium, which makes them potentially interesting for the metallurgical industry.

The second peak is  Pallas -(Japanese 白烟山; Shirokemuriyama) with a height of 993 meters in the center of the island, which is still an active volcano. A major eruption occurred from 1846 to 1847, with the last known eruption in 1960. Eruptions of uncertainty occurred in 2013 and 2018. Pallas also has a caldera lake, Lake Glazok, about 300 meters wide and 40 meters deep, with acidic water.

History
Ketoy had no permanent habitation prior to European contact, but was visited in summer by the Ainu tribes from Rasshua for hunting. Members of the Russian expedition who visited the island in 1811, found the remains of a wooden cross with the word "God", which was presented as evidence of the gradual Christianization and Russification of the Ainu; however, a census in 1831 found no permanent inhabitants. Claimed by the Empire of Russia, sovereignty was passed to the Empire of Japan per the Treaty of Saint Petersburg along with the rest of the Kuril islands. The island was formerly administered as part of Shimushiro District of Nemuro Subprefecture of Hokkaidō. After World War II, the island came under the control of the Soviet Union, and is now administered as part of the Sakhalin Oblast of the Russian Federation.

See also
List of volcanoes in Russia

References

Further reading 
 Gorshkov, G. S. Volcanism and the Upper Mantle Investigations in the Kurile Island Arc. Monographs in geoscience. New York: Plenum Press, 1970. 
 Krasheninnikov, Stepan Petrovich, and James Greive. The History of Kamtschatka and the Kurilski Islands, with the Countries Adjacent. Chicago: Quadrangle Books, 1963.
 Rees, David. The Soviet Seizure of the Kuriles. New York: Praeger, 1985. 
 Takahashi, Hideki, and Masahiro Ōhara. Biodiversity and Biogeography of the Kuril Islands and Sakhalin. Bulletin of the Hokkaido University Museum, no. 2-. Sapporo, Japan: Hokkaido University Museum, 2004.

External links

 Sakhalin Oblast

Active volcanoes
Islands of the Sea of Okhotsk
Islands of the Russian Far East
Stratovolcanoes of Russia
Islands of the Kuril Islands
Uninhabited islands of Russia
Uninhabited islands of the Pacific Ocean
Calderas of Russia
Volcanoes of the Kuril Islands
Mountains of the Kuril Islands
Holocene stratovolcanoes